The 5th Madgwick Cup was a non-championship Formula Two motor race held at Goodwood Circuit on 27 September 1952. The race was won by Ken Downing in a Connaught Type A-Lea Francis. Teammate Dennis Poore was second, setting fastest lap in the process, and Alan Brown in a Cooper T20-Bristol was third.

Results

References

Madgwick Cup
Madgwick Cup